Teófilo Augusto de Barros Neto better known as Theo de Barros (10 March 1943 – 15 March 2023) was a Brazilian composer.  From the 1960s he released and participated on albums with other Brazilian artists.

De Barros was known for his collaborations with Geraldo Vandré, for example on Disparada (tied with A banda by Chico Buarque for 1st place in the 2nd Festival de Música popular brasileira (MPB) 1966, produced and broadcast by TV Record), and for the song Menino das laranjas, recorded by Elis Regina that same year.

In 1966 the band Quarteto Novo was formed (with de Barros, Airto Moreira, Heraldo do Monte and later Hermeto Pascoal), and in 1967 released one album which launched the careers of its members  and had wide influence.

De Barros also collaborated with Inezita Barroso on her album Afinal.

De Barros died on 15 March 2023, at the age of 80.

References

External Links
 
  as Theo de Barros Jr.

1943 births
2023 deaths
Brazilian jazz composers
Quarteto Novo members
Male jazz composers
20th-century jazz composers
20th-century Brazilian musicians
20th-century male musicians
21st-century jazz composers
21st-century Brazilian musicians
21st-century male musicians